Muncha-Yelga (Munsayılğa) is a rural locality (a village) in Starokuruchevsky Selsoviet, Bakalinsky District, Bashkortostan, Russia. The population was 30 as of 2010. There is 1 street.

Geography 
Muncha-Yelga is located 37 km southeast of Bakaly (the district's administrative centre) by road. Novochikeyevo is the nearest rural locality.

References 

Rural localities in Bakalinsky District